The 1954 United States Senate election in Mississippi was held on November 2, 1954. Incumbent Democratic U.S. Senator James Eastland won re-election to his third term.

Because Eastland faced only nominal opposition in the general election, his victory in the August 24 primary over Lieutenant Governor Carroll Gartin was tantamount to election.

Democratic primary

Candidates
James Eastland, incumbent Senator since 1943
Carroll Gartin, Lieutenant Governor of Mississippi

Results

General election

Results

See also 
 1954 United States Senate elections

Notes

References 

1954
MIssissippi
1954 Mississippi elections